Vitamin K reactions occur after injection with vitamin K, and there are two patterns of presentation, (1) a reaction may occur several days to 2 weeks after injection with skin lesions that are pruritic, red patches and plaques that can deep-seated, involving the dermis and subcutaneous tissue, or (2) with subcutaneous sclerosis with or without fasciitis, that appears at the site of injection many months after treatment.  The latter pseudosclerodermatous reaction has been termed Texier's disease and lasts several years.

See also 
Texier's disease
Skin lesion
List of cutaneous conditions

References

External links 

Drug eruptions